Events in the year 1946 in India.

Incumbents
 Emperor of India – George VI
 Viceroy of India – The Viscount Wavell

Events
 National income - 77,566 million
 January – Royal Air Force Mutiny of 1946 of British and Indian air force units
 11 February – I.N.A. trial demonstrations in Calcutta, several killed
 12 February – Hartal in Calcutta over the killing of demonstrators the previous day
 18 February – Start of the Royal Indian Navy Mutiny
 22 February – Start of hartal in Bombay in support of the mutiny, which saw the British kill over 200 citizens
 10 May – Nehru elected leader of the Congress Party.
 19 August – Violence between Muslims and Hindus in Calcutta leaves 3,000 dead.
 2 September – interim government formed 
 4 September – Street violence between Muslims and Hindus in Bombay.
 27 November – Prime Minister Jawaharlal Nehru appeals to the United States and the Soviet Union to end nuclear testing and to start nuclear disarmament, stating that such an action would "save humanity from the ultimate disaster."
 1946 Cabinet Mission to India on March 24 
 Tata Airlines renamed Air India.
 Provincial Elections

Law
 9 December – Constituent Assembly for India meets for the first time.
Industrial Employment (Standing Orders) Act
Foreigners Act

Births

January to June
16 January – Kabir Bedi, actor.
1 February – Giri Babu, actor.
7 March – Gerald Almeida, bishop of Jabalpur
18 March – Navin Nischol, actor of Bollywood films (died 2011).
4 June  S. P. Balasubrahmanyam, playback singer and actor (died 2020).

July to September
5 July – Mamukkoya, comedian actor.
5 July – Ram Vilas Paswan, politician. (died 2020).
17 July – Lalitha Lenin, poet and academic.
28 July – Saint Alphonsa, Sister Alphonsa Muttathupadathu, in 2008 became first woman of Indian origin to be canonized as a saint (born 1910).
20 August – N. R. Narayana Murthy, industrialist and software engineer.

October to December
11 October – Vijay P. Bhatkar, computer scientist.
12 October – Ashok Mankad, Test cricketer (died 2008).
15 October – Victor Banerjee, actor.
9 December – Sonia Gandhi, politician.
14 December – Sanjay Gandhi, politician 
16 October - Naveen Patnaik, politician
26 December – Narendra Prasad, actor, playwright, teacher and literary critic (died 2003).
27 December – Vijay Arora, actor (died 2007).

Full date unknown
Mani Damodara Chakyar, Kutiyattam and Chakyar Koothu artist.

Deaths
6 February – Upendranath Brahmachari, scientist and medical practitioner (born 1873).
12 October – Vellakal Palaniapa Subramania Mudaliar, retired veterinary college Dean, landlord, and Tamil scholar (born 1857).

References

 
India
Years of the 20th century in India